"This Is Halloween" is a song from the 1993 film The Nightmare Before Christmas, with music and lyrics written by Danny Elfman. In the film it is performed by the residents of the fictional "Halloween Town", which is the film's main setting, and introduces the town's Halloween-centered lifestyle. The song is featured in both HalloWishes at the Magic Kingdom and at Disneyland's Halloween Screams. In Calaway Park, it is featured in the haunted mansion. It is also used as the background music for the Halloween Town world in the video game Kingdom Hearts. The song is featured in the video game Just Dance 3.

Elfman later expressed happiness with the song's longevity, commenting in 2021, "When [Nightmare] came out, I did a two-day press junket and virtually every interview started with: 'Too scary for kids, right?' ... So to come back years later and to see families out there, and to be getting recordings of people's kids who are 4 years old singing 'What's This' or 'This is Halloween,' makes me really feel blessed. It's like a second life and proving them wrong."

Covers
"This Is Halloween" was covered by the band Marilyn Manson in 2006 for the special edition release of the film's soundtrack and subsequently included on the 2008 cover album, Nightmare Revisited.

The song was also covered by Panic! at the Disco for the 2006 soundtrack reissue.

On the 2011 album V-Rock Disney, which features visual kei artists covering Disney songs, Sadie covered this song.

The Swiss/German symphonic metal band Ad Infinitum did a cover in 2020.

2004 re-recording
The song was re-recorded for the 2004 video game The Nightmare Before Christmas: Oogie's Revenge that can be heard during gameplay.

Charts

References

1993 songs
The Nightmare Before Christmas
Disney songs
Marilyn Manson (band) songs
Panic! at the Disco songs
Songs written by Danny Elfman
Halloween songs